Gavin Harry Heeroo (born 2 September 1984) is a footballer who is currently a free agent.

Career
Born in Haringey, London, Heeroo started his career with Crystal Palace as a trainee, making his first team debut as a substitute in a 1–1 draw with Preston North End in the First Division. He later joined Billericay Town, who he played for between July and October 2004, before moving to Grays Athletic, who he joined in October. He joined Farnborough Town in March 2005. He had an unsuccessful trial for Histon in September. He joined Cambridge United on a month's loan in November 2005. He then played for Chelmsford City, Fisher Athletic, Sutton United and Eastleigh. Heeroo joined Eastleigh in March 2009 from Isthmian League team Sutton United. He signed for Ebbsfleet United in August.
Heroo was released by Ebbsfleet in the summer of 2010.
He has played for the Mauritius national football team, earning one cap in 2002.

Outside of his football career, Heroo founded a fitness training business, Focus Fitness, alongside friend and former Crystal Palace teammate Dougie Freedman.

References

External links

1984 births
Living people
English footballers
Mauritian footballers
Mauritius international footballers
Association football midfielders
Crystal Palace F.C. players
Billericay Town F.C. players
Grays Athletic F.C. players
Farnborough F.C. players
Cambridge United F.C. players
Chelmsford City F.C. players
Fisher Athletic F.C. players
Sutton United F.C. players
Eastleigh F.C. players
Ebbsfleet United F.C. players
English Football League players
National League (English football) players